Acelya Toprak (born 1 June 1998) is an English international judoka. She has represented England at the Commonwealth Games and won a silver medal.

Biography
Toprak was won the 2017 European junior silver medal and won gold at the Dubrovnik European Cup in 2021. She is a three times champion of Great Britain, winning the half-lightweight division at the British Judo Championships in 2016, 2017 and 2021.

In 2022, she was selected for the 2022 Commonwealth Games in Birmingham, where she competed in the women's -57 kg, winning the silver medal.

References

External links
 
 

1998 births
Living people
English female judoka
British female judoka
Judoka at the 2022 Commonwealth Games
Commonwealth Games competitors for England
Commonwealth Games silver medallists for England
Commonwealth Games medallists in judo
20th-century English women
21st-century English women
Medallists at the 2022 Commonwealth Games